The Firepower World Tour was a worldwide concert tour by English heavy metal band Judas Priest, in support of the album Firepower. It ran from 13 March 2018 to 29 June 2019.

Background
This tour marked the first time that guitarist Glenn Tipton would not perform on a full-length tour after revealing the news that he had been diagnosed with Parkinson's disease on 12 February 2018 and would step down from touring as the disease's progression left him unable to perform the more challenging material. He stated that he was still a member of Judas Priest despite his diagnosis and would not rule out future on-stage appearances. Producer and guitarist Andy Sneap stepped in to perform in his place for the tour. Guitarist Richie Faulkner assured fans that Tipton would perform with the band again. At the 20 March 2018 show in Newark, Tipton joined the band on stage to perform "Metal Gods", "Breaking the Law" and "Living After Midnight", then "Victim of Changes" and "No Surrender" on later dates. He would continue to appear on tour, performing only the encore songs, but would not perform on certain dates, depending on his health. Tipton did not make anymore appearances on the remaining dates due to his illness, as explained by bassist Ian Hill. After the completion of the world tour, Faulkner thanked fans worldwide for attending their shows, "It's been emotional and amazing to see you all and share in the celebration of heavy metal all around the world. It's been a pleasure and an honour to serve. See ya on the next one RHRF DOTF."

Rob Halford incident
Shortly into the song "Judas Rising" at the 25 May 2019 show in Rosemont, Rob Halford kicked a cell phone out of a fan's hands in frustration as the fan had the phone light on while filming the show, causing difficulty on his performance. Halford explained in a statement soon after that fans are free to capture footage of their shows, "However if you physically interfere with The Metal God's performance you now know what will happen." Uriah Heep vocalist Bernie Shaw stepped in to defend Halford and said that he understood his frustration, but felt that he took it "a little bit too far", and opined that his "space was invaded." He thought that Halford "overreacted — but I can sure understand where it came from."

Lineup 
 Rob Halford – vocals
 Richie Faulkner – guitars, backing vocals
 Ian Hill – bass guitar
 Scott Travis – drums, backing vocals
 Andy Sneap – guitars (touring)
 Glenn Tipton – guitars (occasional appearances)

Support acts
 Saxon & Black Star Riders (13 March 2018 – 1 May 2018; except on 30 March, 21 April & 5 May shows) 
 Megadeth (5 June 2018, 10 June 2018 – 13 June 2018, 19 June 2018 – 20 June 2018 & 26 June 2018) 
 Lords of Black (28 June 2018)  
 Ozzy Osbourne (Judas Priest was the opening band for Osbourne at the 2 July 2018 show) 
 Rehmorha (22 July 2018) 
 Ørdøg (24 July 2018) 
 Accept (28 July 2018) 
 Black Star Riders (31 July 2018) 
 Uriah Heep (8 August 2018) 
 Deep Purple & The Temperance Movement (21 August 2018 – 30 September 2018) 
 Helloween, Kreator, Arch Enemy, etc. (26 October 2018) 
 Alice in Chains & Black Star Riders (2 November 2018 – 11 November 2018) 
 Babymetal (4 December 2018) 
 Disconnected (27 January 2019) 
 Halestorm (16 March 2019) 
 Uriah Heep (3 May 2019 – 29 June 2019; except on 4 May 2019)

Setlists
The 2018 to early 2019 setlist featured material from Firepower, fan favourites and material that was not performed in decades such as "Bloodstone", "Some Heads Are Gonna Roll", "Tyrant", "Night Comes Down", "Delivering the Goods" and "Killing Machine". The song "Saints in Hell" was introduced to the audience which was never performed live. The third North American portion of the tour in 2019 featured an updated stage appearance and a brand new setlist featuring other tracks from Firepower, other various fan favourites, and a few more songs that were not played in decades such as "Out in the Cold", "All Guns Blazing" and "Hot Rockin'". The band introduced another song, "(Take These) Chains", which was also never performed live.

Tour dates 

Cancelled dates

Box office score data

References

External links 
 Tour information

2018 concert tours
2019 concert tours
Judas Priest concert tours